Gabriel Timmory (6 November 1870 - 20 April 1965) was a French dramatist, teacher, journalist, lecturer and screenwriter. For a number of plays, comedies and saynetes he collaborated with the playwrights Jean Manoussi and Maurice de Marsan. In 1921, he made an adaptation of « Fantomas » for the stage.

Theatre plays 

 1902: Un beau mariage cowritten with Jean Manoussi
 1903: Petite Bonne sérieuse cowritten with Jean Manoussi
 1904: Pomme de terre cowrittenwith Jean Manoussi
 1906: Un gentilhomme cowritten with Jean Manoussi
 1906: Le Planteur de Chicago or Le cultivateur de Chicago
 1909: Un cambrioleur ingénieux cowritten with Jean Manoussi
 1910: Le Matelot Cartahut cowritten with Maurice de Marsan 
 1911: La Course aux dollars cowritten with Maurice de Marsan 
 1913: Rigadin et la petite Moulinet 
 1913: La Dame du Louvre cowritten with Jean Manoussi
 1913: L'insaisissable Stanley Collins cowritten with Maurice de Marsan 
 1918: Les Kriekenrinckx d'Anvers 
 1918: Les Profiteurs
 1919: Oublions le passé 
 1919: Conte à Madelon
 1920: Monsieur Pédicule 
 1921: Ici on danse
 1921: La guerre en pantoufles cowritten with Félix Galipaux 
 1921: Les Exploits de Lucienne
 1921: Les Points de chute
 1923: Manuel déraisonné de tous les sports 
 1923: Les Affaires d'amour
 1926: Straban le féroce 
 1926: Les Étapes de la volupté en vingt arrondissements 
 1928: Nous allons passer une bonne soirée ! cowritten with Félix Galipaux 
 1930: Un désespéré
 1932: La Compression
 1933: Le Goûter chez Nanette 
 1936: Je veux une aventure, (poetry)
 1937: La Maison historique, monologue by François Timmory  
 1939: Le Banquet de la Fraternelle 
 1949: Ce qui se passe après, adaptation of the play The Sequel by Percival Wilde  
 1951: L'éboulement, adaptation of the play by Percival Wilde

Screenwriter 
 1909: Le mariage de la cuisinière, anonymous 
 1909: Le Client de province, anonymous   
 1909: Un Cambrioleur ingénieux, co-screenwriter with Jean Manoussi
 1910: Le Truc de Rigadin by Georges Monca 
 1911: Rigadin veut se faire arrêter by Georges Monca
 1911: Nick Winter contre Nick Winter, by Gérard Bourgeois 
 1912: Rigardin et la petite moulinet, by Georges Monca
 1948: Les Souvenirs ne sont pas à vendre, co-screenwriter with Robert Hennion

External links 
 Gabriel Timmory on data.bnf.fr
 Filmographie de Gabriel Timmory
 Filmographie succincte

20th-century French dramatists and playwrights
20th-century French screenwriters
Writers from Rennes
1870 births
1965 deaths